An American Music Band was the second album by the band the Electric Flag, released in 1968. Band founding member Mike Bloomfield had earlier left the group and did not perform on this release.

Overview
This LP was released in December 1968, on Columbia CS 9714. It featured mostly original material, but with a cover version of Bobby Hebb's "Sunny".  The record reached number 76 on the Billboard Album Chart. By March 15, 1969, in its ninth week on the Billboard album chart, the LP had dropped from no 88 to no 107.

Mike Bloomfield did not play on the album as he had left the band in May 1968. Herbie Rich played a more active part than he had in the band previously. His organ solos can be heard on "Hey, Little Girl", and their rendition of "Sunny" with Buddy Miles on vocals. Rich also played the sax solo and sang lead on the song "Qualified". He played the sax solo for "My Woman That Hangs Around The House" and arranged the horns for "Mystery". Buddy Miles also was now more prominent and was the only member featured on the album cover.

Track listing

Personnel
 Harvey Brooks – bass, guitar, vocals
 Terry Clements – tenor saxophone
 Marcus Doubleday – trumpet
 Virgil Gonsalves – baritone saxophone, flute
 Nick Gravenites – vocals, rhythm guitar, percussion
 Stemsy Hunter – alto saxophone, vocals
 Buddy Miles – drums, vocals, guitar on "Soul Searchin'"
 Herbie Rich – organ, tenor saxophone, vocals  
 John Simon – piano
 Hoshal Wright – guitar

References

1968 albums
The Electric Flag albums
Columbia Records albums
Albums produced by John Simon (record producer)